The 1961 Arizona State Sun Devils football team was an American football team that represented Arizona State University in the Border Conference during the 1961 NCAA University Division football season. In their fourth season under head coach Frank Kush, the Sun Devils compiled a 7–3 record (3–0 against Border opponents), won the conference championship, and outscored their opponents by a combined total of 287 to 163.

The team's statistical leaders included Joe Zuger with 879 passing yards, Nolan Jones with 411 rushing yards, and Charley Taylor with 235 receiving yards.

Schedule

References

Arizona State
Arizona State Sun Devils football seasons
Border Conference football champion seasons
Arizona State Sun Devils football